Smithers-Oasis is a company specializing in floristry products headquartered in Kent, Ohio, United States.  The company created water-absorbing foam in 1954.

History 

The company was founded in 1954 by V.L. Smithers in Kent, Ohio after he developed a water absorbent foam to use in floral arrangements. Since then, other products have been developed including floral accessories, cellular growing media, and post-harvest plant products. The company is headquartered in Kent and operates a manufacturing plant there. Corporate offices were returned to Kent in late 2013 from Cuyahoga Falls, where they had been located since 1992.

Products

Wet floral foam 
Oasis is a trademarked name for wet floral foam, the spongy phenolic foam used for real flower arranging. It soaks up water like a sponge and acts both as a preservative to prolong the life of the flowers and a support to hold them in place. The foam's structure is similar to that of plants and has capillary action to move water to the surface and up the stem. It is often green, but is also available in many other colors, such as purple, red, yellow, and brown. It is usually supplied in a brick shape, but can be bought in spherical shapes.  Oasis can be bought wholesale or in arts and craft and gardening stores, particularly ones that feature large faux flower collections for creating artificial arrangements.

Dry floral foam 
Sahara and Sahara II are the trademarked names for dry floral foam distributed by the Smithers-Oasis Company and used for supporting arrangements of artificial flowers.  They do not manufacture this product.  The company also offers products using extruded polystyrene and molded urethane which are also distributed, not manufactured.

Colored floral foam 
Rainbow Foam is the trademarked name for colored floral foam produced by the Smithers-Oasis in France. It doesn't contain the same formulation as the regular wet floral foam, thus requires other soaking directions before use.

Environmental Impact 
Floral foam is non-biodegradable, non-recyclable and toxic for both humans and animals.

The Royal Horticultural Society announced in January 2020 that floral foam would be banned from all RHS Shows from 2021.

Usage in Pop Culture 

The rise of ASMR videos can be accredited to the usage of floral foam. Many individuals use the floral foam because of its crushability and the sound that comes from being crushed. Another popular thing ASMR-ists do with Oasis wet floral foam, specifically, is to soak it in water and then crush it. This demonstrates the soaking ability of Oasis wet floral foam. Videos range from running over wet floral foam to cutting up the Sahara dry floral foam. In the ASMR community, Oasis wet floral foam and Sahara dry floral foam is deemed as the best kind of floral foam to use, and many videos highlight the brand's name.   However, with more non-florists using floral foam and not disposing of it properly, there has been an increase in microplastic pollution.

References

External links 

 Technical facts

Brand name materials
Florist companies
Kent, Ohio
Packaging materials
Companies based in Ohio